The Philadelphia Contributionship for the Insurance of Houses from Loss by Fire is the oldest property insurance company in the United States. It was organized by Benjamin Franklin in 1752, and incorporated in 1768.

The Contributionship's building, at 212 S. 4th Street between Walnut and Locust Streets in the Society Hill neighborhood of Philadelphia, was built in 1835-36 and was designed by Thomas U. Walter in the Greek Revival style, with Corinthian columns. The portico was replaced in 1866 by Collins and Autenreith who also expanded the living quarters on the top two floors by the addition of a mansard roof.  A marble cornice between the third and fourth floors was also added.  The building was listed on the National Register of Historic Places in 1971 and was designated a National Historic Landmark in 1977.

History
The Philadelphia Contributionship was founded in 1752, largely through the efforts of Benjamin Franklin. It was structured as a mutual insurance organization, providing fire insurance to a limited area in and around Philadelphia.  It introduced several key principles that underpin modern insurance techniques, including inspecting properties to be insured, and setting rates based on a risk assessment.  Buildings that were not constructed to specified standards were rejected for coverage, and rates could be raised for unsafe living practices, such as the storage of combustible materials in wooden buildings.  The company also was the first to establish a financial reserve from which to pay claims.

Franklin's newspaper, The Pennsylvania Gazette, first began to advertise the upcoming (April 13, 1752) organizational meeting in its issue of February 18, with a notice that "All persons inclined to subscribe to the articles of insurance of houses from fire, in or near this city, are desired to appear at the Court-house, where attendance will be given, to take in their subscriptions, every seventh day of the week, in the afternoon, until the 13th of April next, being the day appointed by the said articles for electing twelve directors and a treasurer."  

The company directors at first met in taverns and other public meeting spaces, with larger organizational meetings taking place at the courthouse.  Its directors finally purchased land for a permanent headquarters in 1835.  Although the company has not innovated in insurance practices since its early days, it continues to function as an insurer in the Philadelphia area.

Early directors

See also

 History of insurance
 History of cooperatives in the United States
 List of National Historic Landmarks in Philadelphia
 National Register of Historic Places listings in Center City, Philadelphia

References
Notes

External links

 Key events in the history of Contributionship – official website of the Contributionship Companies

Financial services companies established in 1752
Buildings and structures on the National Register of Historic Places in Philadelphia
National Historic Landmarks in Pennsylvania
Office buildings completed in 1836
Society Hill, Philadelphia
1768 establishments in Pennsylvania